"Apologize" (also spelled "Apologise" internationally) is a song written by Ryan Tedder, which first appeared on Timbaland's second studio album Shock Value. It was then released as the third single from that album (fourth in Australia), along with the original recording by OneRepublic.  It accordingly also served as the lead single for OneRepublic's debut album Dreaming Out Loud, produced by Greg Wells. Timbaland's version omits the guitar solo after the second verse in the original, and includes an extra line of percussion, new backing vocals, and added sound samples, in addition to sound mixing and a few other minor changes. The song was the biggest radio airplay hit in the history of the Mainstream Top 40 chart in the United States, with 10,394 plays in one week, until its record was broken by Leona Lewis's "Bleeding Love", which was also co-written by Tedder. The song was a major hit internationally, reaching number one in 16 countries, including Australia, Austria, Canada, Germany, Italy, New Zealand, Sweden, Turkey, and the Netherlands, as well as staying at number one for eight consecutive weeks on the Billboard Pop 100 chart. The song peaked at number two on the Billboard Hot 100, staying in the top-10 for 25 weeks, and spent 13 weeks at number one in Canada.

"Apologize" earned the band a Grammy Award nomination for Best Pop Performance by a Duo or Group with Vocals and was ranked number 50 on the list of the Billboard Hot 100's All-Time Top Songs list from the chart's first 50 years. It spent 25 consecutive weeks in the top 10, the longest stay there for any song since "Smooth" by Santana featuring Rob Thomas, which spent 30 weeks in 1999. It was also ranked number 10 on Billboard's Hot 100 Songs of the Decade.

Music video 
An official video associated with the remix was filmed on September 19, 2007, and released in early October. The video premiered on VH1's Top 20 Countdown on October 27, 2007. The video was directed by Robert Hales and was shot in a recording studio showing OneRepublic performing the song. The video also includes scenes from a New Year's Eve countdown party, starring actor Brian A. Pollack. In a third version of the video, also directed by Robert Hales and associated with the remix, Timbaland is portrayed remixing the song himself. A European version of the video features clips of the film Keinohrhasen, starring Til Schweiger. A Japanese version of the video was also made available for a short time. It features the same footage as the original but has more scenes from different camera angles. It also features footage of people falling and floating in the air in slow motion. The music video currently has 502 million views.

Chart performance 
"Apologize" was OneRepublic's breakout hit. In the United States, "Apologize" peaked at number two on the Billboard Hot 100 for four non-consecutive weeks. It spent 11 weeks at number three and 25 weeks inside the top 10 and peaked at number three for 10 weeks on the Hot 100 Airplay. It also topped the Billboard Pop 100 and became the third single from Shock Value to have topped the chart. It also became the album's first number-one single on the Billboard Adult Top 40. It is also the second consecutive single from Shock Value to reach number one on the US Mainstream Top 40 radio. It became only the tenth song to sell over 5 million by May 2011 in the US. As of February 2014, it had sold 5,819,000 copies. In late 2009, the song was ranked in tenth place on the Billboard Hot 100 Decade-End chart, making it the highest-ranking song and the only top-10 ranking song on there to not top the weekly Billboard Hot 100 chart.

In the UK, "Apologize" climbed to number 32 on the strength of digital downloads alone, and peaked at number three. The song spent 28 consecutive weeks in the top 40 and 13 weeks in the top 10. The song ended 2007 as the year's sixteenth biggest selling single in Britain. In Australia, the single debuted at number 10 on the ARIA Singles Chart, and peaked at number one. It stayed at the top for eight consecutive weeks, and was certified 4× Platinum by ARIA. The song reached number one on both the Canadian Hot 100 and New Zealand RIANZ Chart. It is the most downloaded single of all time in Australia and New Zealand. On Billboard official European Hot 100 Singles chart, the song debuted at number 16, making it the highest debut chart position of any new act in the history of the chart. It later entered the top 10. The song went gold in Russia with 100,000 copies sold.

In Germany, the song was downloaded 437,000 times, making it the third best-selling download single of all time behind Lady Gaga's "Poker Face" and Lena Meyer-Landrut's "Satellite".

Track listing

European CD single
"Apologize" (Timbaland presents OneRepublic) — 3:04
"Apologize" (OneRepublic version) — 3:25

European enhanced CD single
"Apologize" (Timbaland presents OneRepublic) — 3:04
"Apologize" (OneRepublic version) — 3:25
"The Way I Are" (OneRepublic remix) — 3:31
"Apologize" (video)

UK CD single
"Apologize" (Album) — 3:04
"Give It to Me (Laugh at Em)" (remix featuring Justin Timberlake and Jay-Z) [radio edit] — 3:16

UK 12" single
"Apologize" (Album) — 3:04
"Apologize" (Instrumental) — 3:04
"Give It to Me (Laugh at Em)" (remix featuring Justin Timberlake and Jay-Z) [explicit] — 3:20
"Give It to Me (Laugh at Em)" (remix instrumental) — 3:17

Personnel 
 Ryan Tedder – lead vocals, background vocals, piano
 Zach Filkins – lead guitar, viola, backing vocals
 Drew Brown – keyboards, rhythm guitar, glockenspiel
 Eddie Fisher – drums, percussion
 Brent Kutzle – cello, bass

Covers 
 Luke Bryan covered "Apologize" on Doin' My Thing.
 Kris Allen covered "Apologize" on the eighth season of American Idol.
 Dutch symphonic metal band Within Temptation covered the song as part of their weekly radio promos for their 15-year anniversary show, Elements. The song is also featured on their cover album The Q-Music Sessions.
 Swedish alternative metal band All Ends covered the song on their album All Ends.
 Canadian post-hardcore band Silverstein covered the song on the Punk Goes Pop 2 compilation album.
 On February 2, 2010, Soomo Publishing uploaded a parody version of this song, titled "Too Late to Apologize: A Declaration" to YouTube, which has more than 12.5 million views as of July 13, 2022.
 Actor and singer Willam released a parody cover in 2013 titled "RuPaulogize" where she discussed her experiences and disqualification on the fourth season of RuPaul's Drag Race. The season winner Sharon Needles plays RuPaul.
 Female country singer Kacey Musgraves and Pixie Lott have also covered "Apologize".

Charts

Weekly charts

Year-end charts

Decade-end charts

All-time charts

Certifications and sales

Release history

See also 

 List of number-one singles in Australia in 2007
 List of number-one hits of 2007 (Austria)
 List of Hot 100 number-one singles of 2007 (Canada)
 List of European number-one hits of 2007
 List of number-one hits of 2007 (Germany)
 List of number-one hits of 2008 (Italy)
 List of Dutch Top 40 number-one singles of 2007
 List of number-one singles from the 2000s (New Zealand)
 List of number-one hits of 2007 (Sweden)
 List of number-one hits of 2007 (Switzerland)

References 

2006 songs
2007 debut singles
2000s ballads
OneRepublic songs
Timbaland songs
Luke Bryan songs
Number-one singles in Australia
Number-one singles in Austria
Canadian Hot 100 number-one singles
European Hot 100 Singles number-one singles
Number-one singles in Germany
Number-one singles in Italy
Dutch Top 40 number-one singles
Number-one singles in New Zealand
Number-one singles in Poland
Number-one singles in Slovakia
Number-one singles in Sweden
Number-one singles in Switzerland
Number-one singles in Turkey
Song recordings produced by Timbaland
Songs written by Ryan Tedder
Music videos directed by Robert Hales
Pop ballads
Interscope Records singles
Song recordings produced by Greg Wells
Song recordings produced by Ryan Tedder
Silverstein (band) songs
Mosley Music Group singles
Songs containing the I–V-vi-IV progression